The 1995 Dunedin mayoral election was part of the New Zealand local elections held that same year. In 1995, elections were held for the Mayor of Dunedin plus other local government positions. The polling was conducted using the standard first-past-the-post electoral method.

Background
Incumbent mayor Richard Walls was defeated by councillor Sukhi Turner in a surprise result.

Mayoralty results
The following table gives the election results:

References

1995
1995 elections in New Zealand
Politics of Dunedin
1990s in Dunedin